Thomas Palmer (1859–1946) was an American lawyer, developer, and politician in Florida representing Tampa. He served in the Florida Senate including as President of the Florida Senate.

Biography
Thomas Palmer was born in Washington County, Georgia in 1859.

He earned a law degree from the University of Virginia in 1888.

He moved to Tampa in 1889, and shortly afterward was elected mayor of Brooksville, Florida.

He married Ruby Brooks in April 1899.

He was a state senator in 1896 and 1897. In 1901, he represented Tampa and the 11th District.

He proposed stone tablets dating to Spanish occupation in Florida be incorporated into an expansion of the Florida State Capitol. The tablets and the owner's home furnishings were acquired instead by Henry Flagler.

A lawyer and developer, he was involved in the development of the Palma Ceia neighborhood of Tampa.

In 1926 he was recorded as owning Palma Ceia Springs (sometimes formerly written as Palmaceia Springs). A pool was built on the site and a streetcar stop was part of the Port Tampa to Ballast Point line. What remains of the spring can be found at Fred Ball Park alongside Bayshore Boulevard.

In 1909, he was involved in organizing a citrus exchange and used the one in California as a model. He reported the headquarters of the Florida Citrus Exchange would be located in Tampa.

Thomas Palmer died at his home in Tampa on August 11, 1946.

References

External links
 

Florida state senators
1859 births
American real estate businesspeople
20th-century American politicians
Presidents of the Florida Senate
Florida lawyers
Politicians from Tampa, Florida
Businesspeople from Tampa, Florida
19th-century American lawyers
20th-century American lawyers
19th-century American politicians
19th-century American businesspeople
20th-century American businesspeople
1946 deaths